Pennsylvania Canal and Limestone Run Aqueduct is a historic aqueduct and related sites located at Milton, Northumberland County, Pennsylvania. The Milton Section was built in 1829–1830, as part of the West Branch Division of the Pennsylvania Canal. It encompasses 20 contributing structures and 2 contributing sites and consists of the Limestone Run Aqueduct, canal bed, and towpath.

It was added to the National Register of Historic Places in 1978.

References

Canals on the National Register of Historic Places in Pennsylvania
Infrastructure completed in 1829
Transportation buildings and structures in Northumberland County, Pennsylvania
National Register of Historic Places in Northumberland County, Pennsylvania